Craig Boller (born January 29, 1948) is a former American football player and coach. He served as the head football coach at William Penn University in Oskaloosa, Iowa in 1976, compiling a record of 8–2. Boller was the defensive line coach for the Dallas Cowboys of the National Football League (NFL) from 1996 to 1997.

Head coaching record

College

References

1948 births
Living people
Dallas Cowboys coaches
Iowa State Cyclones football coaches
Iowa State Cyclones football players
Memphis Tigers football coaches
Oregon State Beavers football coaches
Tennessee Volunteers football coaches
William Penn Statesmen football coaches
People from Wright County, Iowa
Players of American football from Iowa